The 1987 Notre Dame Fighting Irish football team represented the University of Notre Dame during the 1987 NCAA Division I-A football season.  Tony Rice became the starting quarterback for Notre Dame following an injury to Terry Andrysiak.  The Irish would finish the season 8–4 and earn a berth to the Cotton Bowl Classic.

Schedule

Game summaries

at Michigan

    
    
    
    
    
    

Terry Andrysiak completed 11 of 15 passes for 137 yards and a touchdown while Notre Dame converted four of Michigan's seven turnovers into scores.

Michigan State

Purdue

Pittsburgh

Air Force

USC

Navy

Boston College

    
    
    
    
    
    
    
    
    
    

ND: Mark Green 152 Rush Yds
ND: Tim Brown 294 all-purpose Yds

Alabama

Penn State

Miami (FL)

Cotton Bowl

Personnel

Team players drafted into the NFL
The following players were drafted into professional football following the season.

References

Notre Dame
Notre Dame Fighting Irish football seasons
Notre Dame Fighting Irish football